WOGY, known as "Froggy 104", is an American FM radio station licensed to Jackson, Tennessee, and owned by Forever Media through Forever South Licenses, LLC.   As of October, 2007, the programming format is country music.  The station is a 100,000 watt radio station that reaches as far north as Kentucky and even covers the eastern suburbs of Memphis.

History

104.1 MHz Jackson 

The station was formerly Eagle 104 with the callsigns WTNV and was owned by Clear Channel Communications. After becoming Froggy 104 the callsign was WJGY

WOGY callsign 

The callsign WOGY once belonged to a radio station in Memphis, Tennessee at the 94.1 MHz frequency known as "Froggy 94", which is currently WLFP. The station was owned by Sinclair Broadcast Group which ran the format from March 1993 to January 2001 until Entercom bought the station and flipped the format.

WOGY was then owned, but never used, by a northwestern Tennessee Radio Group. When that group relinquished control of the callsign, Forever South then gained control and changed the WJGY callsign to its current state.

Currently 
104 became 'Froggy 104' on August 1, 2006. "The Morning Splash" features Tad Pole and Julie Cooke, mid-days are hosted by Cricket, afternoons with Al Gee and "The Big Time with Whitney Allen" rounds out the weekdays.   Kix Brooks and American Country Countdown, "The Big Time Saturday Night", and special local programming like Sunday Morning in the South are featured on the weekends.

Coverage 
Cities in WOGY's West Tennessee coverage area include: Jackson, Bolivar, Dyersburg, Union City, Paris, and Lexington, Tennessee.

Sister stations 
Forever also owns "92.3 the Hog" WHHG The Willie Radio Network (1390 WTJF and 94.1FM) as well as JJ 97.7 WYJJ.

References

External links 

Radio 731 Website

OGY
Country radio stations in the United States